Kamaganahally Thippeswamy (1940/1 – 11 April 2021) was an Indian politician from Andhra Pradesh. He was a leader of Indian National Congress. He was once an MLA from Hindupur assembly constituency.

Career 
In 1978, he contested as INC(I) candidate from Hindupur, won as MLA defeating K Nagabhushan Reddy of Janata Party. In 1983 he lost to P Ranganayakulu of Telugu Desam Party.

References

1940s births
Year of birth uncertain
2021 deaths
Indian National Congress politicians from Andhra Pradesh
Members of the Andhra Pradesh Legislative Assembly
People from Anantapur, Andhra Pradesh
People from Rayalaseema